Love Returns is a 2017 South Korean television series starring Lee Sung-yeol, Pyo Ye-jin, Lee Dong-ha, and Han Hye-rin. The series airs daily on KBS1 from 8:25 p.m. to 9:00 p.m. (KST) starting from November 13, 2017.

Synopsis
The drama follows the life a woman who ends up losing everything after living a turbulent life. When she starts anew from the bottom, her life blossoms. The value that holds us together is not blood nor law, but rather the love and affection between us.

Cast

Main
 Lee Sung-yeol as Hong Seok-pyo
 He grew up without knowing mother's love because his parents were always busy with work. He is cranky and sensitive and is very mistrustful of those who approach him. Thanks to his mother who is the founder of Genius Cosmetics, he is a major shareholder and CEO and contributes to company's growth. However, symptoms of panic disorder cast dark shadows on his future. To top that off, he is falsely accused for malpractice and embezzlement and ends up being put on probation for two years. To fulfill his pledge to the judge, he becomes the 'undercover boss' and works at the Genius Beauty Center to experience what it's like to be at the bottom of the social ladder. There, he meets the woman of his fate, Eunjo
 Pyo Ye-jin as Gil Eun-jo
She is a spontaneous, sentimental and stubborn woman. She hated her rich stepmother, Haengja, who came into her life when she was in high school. She never treated Haengja like a mother even though she used her money like it was hers. But when she experiences her father's sudden death and stepmother's absence, then only she begins to realize what the love of family is. She starts anew from the bottom and learns the true meaning of life.
 Lee Dong-ha as Byun Boo-shik
  He had to live by himself since middle school because his stepfather rejected him. His mother barely looked after him. Five years later, she came back to his side with a huge debt from his stepfather. That's when Boosik swore to the world, that no matter what, he'd live his life cunningly. He graduated from law school and became a lawyer at a late age. As a deep-dyed utilitarian, he chases benefits rather than duty or cause. He is gifted with the ability to please others. He puts on a mask and never reveals his real emotions.
 Han Hye-rin as Jung In-woo
She lived a difficult life because of her father who left the family after divorce. Her perseverance and righteousness helped her cope with this unfriendly world. She enters the Genius Beauty Center as an intern, thanks to the skin care certificate that she got during high school. But the head of the Beauty Center, Gu Jonghee, and a nasty customer named Gil Eunjo don't let her live in peace. But one day, her hated father comes back with a huge sum of money in his hands. Life suddenly becomes fun for her.

Supporting

Eun-jo's family and people at Geum-dong market
 Song Ok-sook as Kim Haeng-ja
 Kim Sun-woong as Oh Dae Young
 Go Byung-wan as Gil Myung-jo
 Yoon Sa-bong as Park Bo-geum
 Kim Han-joon as Joo Yoon-bal
 Eun Seo-yeol as Min Yang-ah
 Ok Joo-ri as rice-cake shop president

In-woo's family and people at Sook-yi's Beauty Salon
 Lee Byung-joon as Jung Geun-seop
 Park Myung-shin as Jang Jung-sook
 Yoon Young-ah as Jung In-jung
 Lee Ah-hyun as Dong Mi-ae

Seok Pyo's family and people at genius group
 Kim Beop-rae as Goo Choong-seo
 Song Yoo-hyun as Goo Jong-hee
 Yoo Ji-yeon as Hong Kyung-ha

Others
 Kim Seul-gi as Secretary Lee
 Kim Ki-hyeon

Production
 The series had a working title, I Believe Even If I Hate.
 Pyo Ye-jin and Lee Sung-yeol got the lead roles for the first time in this series.

Original soundtrack

Part 1

Part 2

Part 3

Part 4

Part 5

Part 6

Part 7

Part 8

Ratings 
 In this table,  represent the lowest ratings and  represent the highest ratings.

Episode 3 did not air on November 15, due to special news coverage of the Pohang earthquake.
Episode 64 did not air on February 9 due to coverage of the Opening Ceremonies of the 2018 PyeongChang Winter Olympic Games.
Episode 83 did not air on March 9 due to coverage of the Opening Ceremonies of the 2018 PyeongChang Winter Paralympics Games.
Episode 101 did not air on April 5 due to the special broadcast of the Spring is Coming concert held in Pyongyang, North Korea.
Episode 116 did not air on April 27 due to special news coverage of the inter-Korean summit.

Awards and nominations

References

External links
  
 

Korean Broadcasting System television dramas
2017 South Korean television series debuts
Korean-language television shows
South Korean melodrama television series
2018 South Korean television series endings